Warne Marsh & Susan Chen, is an album by saxophonist Warne Marsh and pianist Susan Chen recorded in 1986 (with one track from 1985) and released on the Interplay label.

Reception 

Allmusic states, "the music is generally quite rewarding. Warne Marsh was in prime form during the last years of his life, and Susan Chen (who had studied with Tristano for four months) was starting to develop her own style".

Track listing 
All compositions by Warne Marsh except where noted.
 "This Thing" – 3:00
 "Summer Morning" – 2:38
 "Summer Evening" – 2:38
 "Pennies" – 1:47
 "Always" – 3:30
 "Marvelous Words" – 2:52
 "Strike Out" – 2:20
 "Another You" – 2:38
 "It's You" – 2:05
 "Alright" – 3:25
 "Skylark" (Hoagy Carmichael, Johnny Mercer) – 4:00
 "This Be Love" – 3:38
 "Have You Met?" – 1:52
 "Again" – 1:53
Recorded at Music Box Recording Studio, NYC on June 17, 1985 (track 11) and at Classic Sound Productions Studio, NYC on January 14, 1986 (tracks 1–10 & 12–14)

Personnel 
Warne Marsh – tenor saxophone
Susan Chen – piano

References 

Warne Marsh albums
1986 albums
Interplay Records albums